The original coat of arms of New Brunswick was granted to New Brunswick by a Royal Warrant of Queen Victoria on May 26, 1868. The provincial flag is a banner of the arms.

History
The original coat of arms, consisting solely of the shield, was based on the design of the Great Seal of New Brunswick, which featured a sailing ship.

The achievement of arms was augmented with crest and motto by an Order in Council of then-Lieutenant Governor John Babbitt McNair in 1966. The supporters and compartment were added by Royal Warrant of Queen Elizabeth II on 24 September 1984, and presented to the province in a public ceremony in Fredericton the following day to mark the province's bicentennial.

Symbolism
Crest
The crest, an Atlantic salmon that is leaping, sits on a golden helmet and a coronet of maple leaves, and is marked with St. Edward's crown, all three symbols of royal authority.
 
Shield
The shield features a lion passant in chief, commemorating both England (whose arms feature three such lions) and Brunswick (whose arms have two). The principal charge is an ancient galley, symbolizing the maritime province's links to the sea.

Compartment
The compartment is covered by the provincial flower, the purple violet, and the fiddlehead, an edible fern that grows in New Brunswick.

Supporters
The supporters are white-tailed deer collared with Maliseet wampum, and bear badges of the Union colours and of the fleurs-de-lis of royal France, to commemorate the colonization of the area by those powers.

Motto
The motto, Spem reduxit means "Hope Restored", refers to the province's having acted as a haven for Loyalist refugees who fled there after the American Revolution.

See also
Symbols of New Brunswick
Flag of New Brunswick
Canadian heraldry
National symbols of Canada
List of Canadian provincial and territorial symbols
Heraldry

References

External links

Symbols (Government of New Brunswick).
The Provincial Flag and Coat of Arms (NB Travel Guide – new-brunswick.net).
 The Arms of New Brunswick.
Arms and flag of New Brunswick in the online Public Register of Arms, Flags and Badges.
 Royal Warrant granting Armorial Bearings for the Provinces of Ontario, Quebec, Nova Scotia, New Brunswick, and a Great Seal for the Dominion of Canada. Canada Gazette, volume 3, number 22, 27 November 1869, page 36.
 Royal Warrant augmenting the arms of New Brunswick. Canada Gazette Part I, volume 120, number 14, 5 April 1986, pages 1748–1750.

New Brunswick
Provincial symbols of New Brunswick
New Brunswick
New Brunswick
New Brunswick
New Brunswick
New Brunswick
New Brunswick
New Brunswick
1868 establishments in Canada